Curtișoara is a commune in Olt County, Muntenia, Romania. It is composed of six villages: Curtișoara, Dobrotinet, Linia din Vale, Pietrișu, Proaspeți and Raițiu.

References

Communes in Olt County
Localities in Muntenia